Chaudhry Muhammad Omar Jaffar is a Pakistani politician who was a Member of the Provincial Assembly of the Punjab, from May 2013 to May 2018.

Early life and education
He was born on 13 August 1982 in Rahim Yar Khan to a landlord family. His father Chaudhry Jaffar Iqbal Gujjar is a former Deputy Speaker of the National Assembly and his mother Begum Ishrat Ashraf is a former member of the National Assembly of Pakistan. His sister Zaib Jaffar is also a politician and a member of the Provincial Assembly of the Punjab.

He completed the General Certificate of Secondary Education in 1999 from St Lawrence College, Ramsgate and received a degree of Bachelor of Arts (Hons) in Business Economics and Finance in 2008 from London Metropolitan University.

Political career
He was elected to the Provincial Assembly of the Punjab as a candidate of Pakistan Muslim League (Nawaz) from Constituency PP-293 (Rahimyar Khan-IX) in 2013 Pakistani general election.

References

Living people
Punjabi people
People from Rahim Yar Khan District
Punjab MPAs 2013–2018
1982 births
Pakistan Muslim League (N) MPAs (Punjab)
People educated at St Lawrence College, Ramsgate
Alumni of London Metropolitan University